A Place on Earth is a 2001 Russian drama film directed by Artur Aristakisyan.

Plot 
A delusional man, who has very high hopes and aspirations, tries to help as many people as he can by creating a hippie commune called the Temple of Love.

References

External links 
 

2001 films
Russian drama films
Films shot in Russia
Films directed by Artur Aristakisyan
Russian black-and-white films
2000s Russian-language films
2001 drama films